Cochylidia rupicola, the chalk-cliff tortrix or conch, is a moth of the family Tortricidae.

Description
Forewings show a rounded apex, a broad brown median fascia and characteristic postmedian and subapical markings. Julius von Kennel provides a full description.

Adults are on wing from June to the end of July. They typically fly from dusk onwards.

The larvae feed on the flowers and seeds of hemp agrimony (Eupatorium cannabinum), gypsywort (Lycopus europaeus), and of Chrysocoma linosyris during August to October. After this feeding period, the larva builds a cocoon near the food plant in which it overwinters.

Distribution
This univoltine species is present in most of Europe and the Near East.

Habitat
The chalk-cliff tortrix can be found in a wide range of habitats, on the woodland margins, in marshes and fens, in stream banks and in lanes.

References

 Curtis, J. (1823-1840): British Entomology; Being Illustrations and Descriptions of the Genera of Insects Found in Great Britain and Ireland: Containing Coloured Figures from Nature of the Most Rare and Beautiful Species, and in Many Instances of the Plants upon which they are Found. Vol VI. Lepidoptera, Part II. London (E. Ellis & Co.).
Fauna Europaea
Biolib
Hantsmoths

External links

Lepiforum.de
Lotmoths

Cochylini
Moths of Europe
Moths of Asia
Moths described in 1834